Hessa Al Muhairi is an Emirati writer who was born in the United Arab Emirates. She published two books for children which are  "Whose Footprints Are These?" and "Dinoraf". In 2018, her book "The Dinoraf" won the Sheikh Zayed Book Award of the Category of Children's Literature.

Education and career 
Hessa Al Muhairi holds a bachelor's degree in Early Childhood Education. In 2014, she attained a double masters in Education Management and Policy from Deakin University in Australia. Currently, she is pursuing her PhD in Education from a British University. Al Muhairi has been working as a nursery teacher since she graduated in 2010. Her first book "Dinoraf", which was published in 2017, won the  Sheikh Zayed Book Award for the category of Children's Literature in 2018. In 2019, The Sheikh Zayed book Award announced that Al Muhairi's book "The Dinoraf" will be translated into English, French and Italian after signing an agreement between an Emirati publisher Al Hudhud and an Italian publisher Marco y Marcos.

Works 

 Whose Footprints Are These? (Original title: Atharu Aqdan Man Hathihi), 2010
 Dinoraf (Original title: al-Dinoraf), 2017

Awards 

 2018: Her story "Dinoraf" won the Sheikh Zayed Book Award for the Category of Children's Literature.

See also 

 Lateefa Buti
 Nadia Al Najjar
 Salha Obeid
 Maryam Saqer Al Qasimi

References 

Emirati women writers
Living people
Emirati writers
21st-century Arabic writers
21st-century Emirati writers
Year of birth missing (living people)